The 35th Assembly District of Wisconsin is one of 99 districts in the Wisconsin State Assembly. Located in northern Wisconsin, the district comprises all of Lincoln and Langlade counties, and parts of northern Oconto County, northwest Shawano County, southern Oneida County, and northern Marathon County.  It includes the cities of Antigo, Merrill, and Tomahawk, and the villages of Aniwa, Birnamwood, Eland, and Mattoon.  It also contains the Council Grounds State Park and about a quarter of the Nicolet National Forest.  The district is represented by Republican Calvin Callahan, since January 2021.

The 35th Assembly district is located within Wisconsin's 12th Senate district, along with the 34th and 36th Assembly districts.

List of past representatives

References 

Wisconsin State Assembly districts
Langlade County, Wisconsin
Lincoln County, Wisconsin
Marathon County, Wisconsin
Oneida County, Wisconsin
Shawano County, Wisconsin